Egisto Massoni (Pisa, 1854  – Venice, 1929) was an Italian painter, of vedute and vistas dal vero. He painted both in oil and watercolor.

Biography
Egisto Massoni was a resident at Pisa. He painted landscapes of the countryside around Rome and seascapes and vedute of Venice. At Turin, in 1884, he exhibited two paintings: In laguna a Venezia and A Canal at Venice.  At the 1894 Societa degli Amatori e Cultori delle Belli Arti in Rome, he exhibited Laguna Veneta a Sottomarina.

References

19th-century Italian painters
Italian male painters
20th-century Italian painters
1854 births
1929 deaths
Painters from Tuscany
Italian landscape painters
People from Pisa
19th-century Italian male artists
20th-century Italian male artists